Hupda, Hupde, Jupda, and variants, may refer to:

 Hupda people, an ethic group of the Amazon
 Hupda language, their language

Language and nationality disambiguation pages